The National Taiwan University Sports Center is a major multi-purpose indoor arena in National Taiwan University, Taipei City, Taiwan. It was built by and is now managed by National Taiwan University. The sports center has 4,200 seats.

Notable events
 2004 FIFA Futsal World Championship.
 2010 FIVB Volleyball World Grand Prix
 2014 League of Legends World Championship

References

External links

2001 establishments in Taiwan
Indoor arenas in Taiwan
National Taiwan University
Sports venues in Taipei
Volleyball venues in Taiwan
Sports venues completed in 2001
Basketball venues in Taiwan